Jacob Henry Bromwell (May 11, 1848 – June 4, 1924) was a U.S. Representative from Ohio from 1894 to 1903.

Biography 
Born in Cincinnati, Ohio, Bromwell resided during his boyhood in Newport, Kentucky.
He attended the public schools of Cincinnati and was graduated from Hughes High School in 1864.
He taught in the public schools of southern Indiana and of Cincinnati for twenty-three years.
He was graduated from Cincinnati Law School in 1870.
He was admitted to the bar of Hamilton County in 1888 and commenced practice in Cincinnati.
He served as mayor of Wyoming, Ohio from 1880 to 1886.
He served as assistant county solicitor of Hamilton County 1888–1892.

Congress 
Bromwell was elected as a Republican to the Fifty-third Congress to fill the vacancy caused by the resignation of John A. Caldwell.
He was reelected to the Fifty-fourth and to the three succeeding Congresses and served from December 3, 1894, to March 3, 1903.
He was not a candidate for renomination in 1902.
He resumed the practice of law in Cincinnati.
He served as judge of the court of common pleas of Hamilton County 1907–1913.
He declined to be a candidate for renomination.
He again engaged in the practice of law.

Death 
He died in Wyoming, Ohio, June 4, 1924.
He was interred in Spring Grove Cemetery, Cincinnati, Ohio.

Sources

1848 births
1924 deaths
University of Cincinnati College of Law alumni
Republican Party members of the United States House of Representatives from Ohio
Mayors of places in Ohio
Ohio lawyers
Politicians from Cincinnati
Burials at Spring Grove Cemetery
People from Wyoming, Ohio
19th-century American lawyers